React or Die is the second album by Butcher Boy. It was released on 13 April 2009 on HDIF Records.

Track listing

"When I'm Asleep" (2:55)
"Carve A Pattern" (4:15)
"You're Only Crying For Yourself" (3:30)
"Anything Other Than Kind" (3:33)
"This Kiss Will Marry Us" (4:50)
"A Better Ghost" (2:05)
"Clockwork" (2:53)
"Why I Like Babies" (2:59)
"Sunday Bells" (2:23)
"React or Die" (1:48)

2009 albums